The 1925 Indian riots refers to the sixteen communal riots which occurred throughout British India. Reported as being among the worst were in March in Delhi, during September in Aligarh, at Arvi in the Wardha district and in Solapur.

Aligarh 
The Aligarh riot occurred on 22 September in the United Provinces of British India (now Uttar Pradesh). Of the sixteen communal riots that occurred that year, it was counted as one of the most severe. The London Times wrote two stories on the riots. The riot, was confined to Aligarh which is in the top five of most riot prone cities in India. According to a report from the Singapore Free Press, on 24 September 1925, it had been said the rioting was caused by Mohammedan throwing stones at some Hindus during the festival of Ramlila, the Hindus retaliated and in the ensuing violence sixty Muslim men and women were injured and twelve Hindus were hospitalized.

Sheikh Abdullah speaking at a Muslim League conference at Aligarh likened the year-long violence to the Crusades, arguing that the most serious danger that Muslims had ever had to deal with was the current Hindu resurgence. The official number of those killed in the riot was six, four Muslims and two Hindus.

References

Bibliography

Riots
Sectarianism
Conflicts in 1925